This is a list of notable bands who have predominately produced industrial music. Separate lists are maintained of bands that predominately produce electro-industrial and industrial metal

0-9

 16 Volt
 3Teeth

A

 à;GRUMH...
 Acumen Nation

 Android Lust
 Angelspit

 Assemblage 23
 Atari Teenage Riot
 Attrition

 The Axis of Perdition

B

 Babyland
 The Beatnigs

 Big Black
 Bigod 20
 Bile

 Birmingham 6
 Bodychoke
 Boyd Rice
 Brighter Death Now

C

 C-Tec
 Cabaret Voltaire
 Cat Rapes Dog
 Celldweller
 Chemlab

 Chrome
 Cindytalk
 The Clay People
 Clipping
 Clock DVA
 Coil
 Collide
 Combichrist
 Consolidated
 Controlled Bleeding
 Cop Shoot Cop
 Crash Worship
 Crocodile Shop
 Crossbreed
 Cubanate
 Current 93

D

 Dälek
 Das Ich

 Dawn of Ashes
 DeathBoy
 Death Grips
 Death in June

 D'espairsRay
 Die Form
 Die Krupps
 Die Warzau

 The Disposable Heroes of Hiphoprisy
 Dive
 Deitiphobia
 DNA
 Doubting Thomas

 dreDDup

E

 Einstürzende Neubauten
 Emigrate
 Eve of Destiny
 Excessive Force

F

Fad Gadget
Feindflug
 Filter
 Flesh Field
 Foetus
 Front 242
 Front Line Assembly
 Funker Vogt

G

 Gazelle Twin
 Genitorturers
 Genocide Organ
 Ghostemane
 God
 Godhead
 Godflesh
 God Lives Underwater
 Gravity Kills
 Greater Than One
Grotus

H

 Hair Police
 Hanatarash
 Hanzel und Gretyl
 Haujobb
 Head of David
 Health
 :de:Heldmaschine

 Ho99o9
 Hocico

I

 Ice
 Icon of Coil
 Igorrr
 In Strict Confidence
 In the Nursery
 Informatik

 Insurge

J

 Jerk

K

 Kevorkian Death Cycle
 Kidneythieves
 Kill the Thrill
 Kill Switch Klick
 Killing Joke
 Klutæ
 KMFDM

L

 Laibach
 Leæther Strip
 Leather Nun
 Lead Into Gold

 Lights of Euphoria
 Lords of Acid

M

 Machines of Loving Grace
 Marilyn Manson

 MDFMK
 Meat Beat Manifesto

 Ministry
 Missing Foundation
 Mortal
 Mortiis
 My Life With The Thrill Kill Kult

N

 The Neon Judgement
 N17
 Nine Inch Nails
 Nitzer Ebb
 The Newlydeads
 Nocturnal Emissions
 NON
 Gary Numan
 Numb
 Nurse With Wound

O

 Ohgr
 Oomph!

P

 Pailhead
 Pain
 Parzival
 Peace, Love and Pitbulls
 Pig
 Pigface
 Pitchshifter
 Pop Will Eat Itself
 Project Pitchfork
 Prong
 Psychopomps
 Psyclon Nine
 PTP aka Programming the Psychodrill

R

Rammstein
 Razed in Black
 The Residents
 The Retrosic
 Revolting Cocks
 Rorschach Test
 Rotersand
 Rx

S

 Schwein
 Sheep on Drugs
 Sister Machine Gun

 Skinny Puppy
 Skrew
 Skold
 SKYND
 Sleep Chamber
 Slick Idiot
 Snake River Conspiracy
 Snog
 Spahn Ranch
 SPK
 A Split-Second
 Stabbing Westward
 Stahlmann
 Static-X
 Street Sects

 Suicide Commando
 Sunn O)))
 Swamp Terrorists
 Swans

T

 Tackhead
 Techno Animal
 Test Dept
 
 Throbbing Gristle
 Tweaker

U

 Undercover Slut

V

 Vampire Rodents
 Velvet Acid Christ
 Videodrone
 VNV Nation
 Vomito Negro

W

 Whitehouse
 Wolf Eyes

 Wumpscut

X

 X Marks the Pedwalk
 Xiu Xiu

Y

 Yelworc
 The Young Gods

Z

 Z'ev
 Zilch
 Zoviet France

See also
List of industrial metal bands
List of electro-industrial bands
List of dark ambient artists
List of drone artists
List of noise musicians

References

Industrial music
Industrial rock